Khalifehlu (also Romanized as Khalīfehlū; also known as Khalfehlū and Khalīfeh Qeshlāqī) is a village in Vilkij-e Markazi Rural District, Vilkij District, Namin County, Ardabil Province, Iran. At the 2006 census, its population was 457, in 92 families.

References 

Towns and villages in Namin County